Keys Park, which is currently known as The PRG Roofing and Construction ground, is the home of the Hednesford Town Football Club, and is situated on Keys Park Road in the town of Hednesford, Staffordshire. The club previously played at the Cross Keys, a ground situated behind the pub of the same name.

The stadium was completed during the summer of 1995, at a cost of £1.3 million. Its original capacity was set at 3,500; a smart main stand housing changing rooms, club offices and social facilities, a shallow uncovered terrace on the Wimblebury side of the ground and two identical covered terraces at either end of the ground.

The stadium was first used in a friendly game against Walsall in July of that year. Keys Park was officially opened by Sir Stanley Matthews later that year, in a ceremony that included a friendly against Wolverhampton Wanderers.

In January 1997, Keys Park saw its highest attendance ever as over 3,000 people witnessed the Pitmen's 1–0 win over York City in the FA Cup Third Round. During the following season, three sides of the ground were developed; the Heath Hayes End was converted into a 1,000 capacity open terrace, whilst the Wimblebury side was turned into a large uncovered terrace. Seating was installed at the previously terraced Hednesford End to raise the ground capacity over the 6,000 needed for a grade 'A' rating by the Football League, which was granted in 1998.

Despite relegation from the Football Conference in 2001, the club proceeded with its plans to make the stadium covered on all four sides, and with the help of a Football Association grant, the club installed roofs on each of the uncovered terraces at the Heath Hayes End and on the Wimblebury Terrace.

The Northern Premier League Play-Off Final between Hednesford and United of Manchester on 11 May 2013 saw a new record with a crowd of 4,412 people to watch the Pitmen win 2-1 and promotion to the Conference North.

References

Football venues in England
Sports venues in Staffordshire
Sports venues completed in 1995
Hednesford